The 1988 Seoul Open was a men's tennis tournament played on outdoor hard courts that was part of the 1988 Nabisco Grand Prix circuit. It was the second edition of the tournament and was played at Seoul in South Korea from 18 April through 25 April 1988. Fifth-seeded Dan Goldie won the singles title.

Finals

Singles

 Dan Goldie defeated  Andrew Castle 6–3, 6–7, 6–0 
 It was Goldie's 2nd title of the year and the 4th of his career.

Doubles

 Andrew Castle /  Roberto Saad defeated  Gary Donnelly /  Jim Grabb 6–7, 6–4, 7–6
 It was Castle's 1st title of the year and the 1st of his career. It was Saad's only title of the year and the 1st of his career.

References

External links
 ITF tournament edition details

 
1988